Pylle is a village and civil parish  south west of Shepton Mallet, and  from Wells, in the Mendip district of Somerset, England. It has a population of 160. The parish includes the hamlet of Street on the Fosse.

The village is very close to the site of the Glastonbury Festival.

History

At the time of the Domesday Book in 1086 the tenant was Serlo de Burci from whom the manor passed by 1303 to William FitzMartin.

Pylle fell within the tithing of Pylle, the hundred of Whitstone, the registration district of Mendip, previously within Shepton Mallet until 1936.

Pylle railway station was a station on the Highbridge branch of the Somerset and Dorset Joint Railway. It opened in 1862 and closed in 1966.

Governance

The parish council has responsibility for local issues, including setting an annual precept (local rate) to cover the council’s operating costs and producing annual accounts for public scrutiny. The parish council evaluates local planning applications and works with the local police, district council officers, and neighbourhood watch groups on matters of crime, security, and traffic. The parish council's role also includes initiating projects for the maintenance and repair of parish facilities, as well as consulting with the district council on the maintenance, repair, and improvement of highways, drainage, footpaths, public transport, and street cleaning. Conservation matters (including trees and listed buildings) and environmental issues are also the responsibility of the council.

The village falls within the Non-metropolitan district of Mendip, which was formed on 1 April 1974 under the Local Government Act 1972, having previously been part of Shepton Mallet Rural District, which is responsible for local planning and building control, local roads, council housing, environmental health, markets and fairs, refuse collection and recycling, cemeteries and crematoria, leisure services, parks, and tourism.

Somerset County Council is responsible for running the largest and most expensive local services such as education, social services, libraries, main roads, public transport, policing and  fire services, trading standards, waste disposal and strategic planning.

It is also part of the  Somerton and Frome  county constituency represented in the House of Commons of the Parliament of the United Kingdom. It elects one Member of Parliament (MP) by the first past the post system of election.

Landmarks

Pylle Manor probably dates from the 17th century, with an 18th-century staircase, and is also listed as a Grade II* building.

Religious sites

The Church of St Thomas à Becket was rebuilt in 1868 for the Portman family of Orchard Portman, but a 15th-century tower from the earlier church remains. It is designated as a Grade II* listed building.

References

External links

 Somerset Archive & Record Service summary of holdings for parish of Pylle
 Transcription of Pylle, Somerset - marriages 1591 to 1799

Villages in Mendip District
Civil parishes in Somerset